List of Nevada Civil War units 

Before statehood, the military units were known as Nevada Territory battalions. Prior to recruiting being authorized, Nevadans enlisted into California units.

Infantry
1st Battalion Nevada Infantry

Cavalry
1st Battalion Nevada Cavalry

See also
Nevada in the American Civil War

Notes/References
Civil War Archive (Nevada)

 
Civil War
Nevada